Christopher Bankole Ndubisi Ogbogbo a native of Delta State, born 10 October 1963 in Lagos, is a Nigerian lawyer, and professor of History. He is a former Head of the University of Ibadan's Department of History, and former President of the Historical Society of Nigeria (2014 – 2018).

Early life and education
Ogbogbo was born in Lagos, and raised in Lagos and Port Harcourt. He studied history at the University of Ibadan and earned law degrees at the Obafemi Awolowo University, Ile-Ife. Ogbogbo has lectured on African History at Ibadan for the past 28 years. He has taught, researched, and supervised over 8 Ph.D. theses in African History and Peace and Conflict Studies, along with about 85 Master's degree dissertations. A senior member of the Nigerian Bar Association, he has also practiced law for almost two decades. He has served as the Public Relations Officer and Treasurer of the NBA Ibadan branch in the early 1990s.

Academic work
Ogbogbo as a scholar has published many books, winning several academic laurels and grants. In his kitty is the Institute for Research in Africa (IFRA) Grant 2005, the MacArthur Foundation Grant 2006, the University of Ibadan Senate Research Grant 2007, and the Humanities Staff Development Grant 2015. He was a visiting scholar to Northwestern University, Dartmouth College, St. Augustine University of Tanzania, Mwanza and the University of Benin in Nigeria. He was appointed a Visiting Professor of African History in Kennesaw State University in Atlanta, Georgia in 2014. He has published over 60 works in reputable academic journals and books. He is the current Editor-in Chief of the Journal of the Historical Society of Nigeria and the Editor of Ibadan School of History Monograph Series. Ogbogbo has written copiously on the Niger Delta and the challenges of nation building in Nigeria. He has gone further to introduce the study of Niger Delta studies to the University of Ibadan History curriculum.

He is a consultant to several organizations such as the Federal Ministry of Education and United Nations Development Programme (UNDP) and a member of several academic bodies, including Ethnic Studies Network, Ireland, American Studies Association, Member, African Studies Association, U.S.A., Historical Society of Nigeria, Nigerian Bar Association and the Society for Peace Studies & Practice. His current passion is to midwife through the instrumentality of the Historical Society of Nigeria, the restoration of the teaching of history in Nigeria's school system.

Ogbogbo is a Fellow of the Historical Society of Nigeria, and of the Society for Peace Studies and Practice.

References

Living people
Residents of Lagos
20th-century Nigerian lawyers
University of Ibadan alumni
20th-century Nigerian historians
1953 births
21st-century Nigerian historians
Academic staff of the University of Ibadan
21st-century Nigerian lawyers